Under the Gunn (also known as Project Runway: Under the Gunn) is an American reality competition series that premiered January 16, 2014, on Lifetime. Production of the series began in November 2013, with the finale filmed on December 17, 2013. The series was filmed at the Fashion Institute of Design and Merchandising in Los Angeles. Guest judges included: Heidi Klum, Neil Patrick Harris,  Macklemore, Jaimie Alexander, Zoey Deutch, Zendaya, Georgina Chapman, Sarah Hyland, Trina Turk, and Wendy Partridge.

Synopsis
Hosted by Tim Gunn, Under the Gunn follows Project Runway alumni Mondo Guerra, Anya Ayoung-Chee, and Nick Verreos as they are handed the task of managing, coaching, and directing 15 designers. Designer Rachel Roy, celebrity stylist Jen Rade, and Marie Claire senior fashion editor Zanna Roberts Rassi serve as the judges. Within the first two episodes, Tim Gunn presents a challenge to the designers while Guerra, Chee, and Verreos analyze the skill level of the contestants and determine which four designers will be a part of their teams. In the following episodes, Gunn presents new challenges that test the mentors' ability to bring out the best in their designers as they guide them through the competition. Each team then competes in a series of challenges until one alumnus and one designer remains.

The winning contestant received a cash prize of $100,000, a sewing and embroidery studio from Brother Industries, an all-expense-paid trip to Paris, Blowpro styling products, a 2014 Lexus CT 200h, the opportunity to design a collection sold exclusively at francesca's, and a fashion spread in Marie Claire magazine plus a spot as guest editor for one year The winner also worked closely with Benefit Cosmetics creative team to design a new uniform for the Benefit Cosmetics field team members.

Season 1

Designers
Source:

: Age at the time of filming.

: The designer was not chosen by any of the mentors and eliminated simultaneously.

Models

 Meredith Hennesy
 Aryanne Padilha
 Ali Marie Stepka
 Janica de Guzman
 Bianca Palmerin
 Ana Kristina
 Ivana Korab
 Ashley Washington
 Aleksandra Rastovic
 Leslie Allen
 Tylynn Nguyen
 Elaine Fonseca
 Amanda Fields
 Milena Illina
 Taylor Reynolds
 Dani Vierra

Designer Progress

 The designer won Under the Gunn.
 The designer won the challenge.
 The designer came in second but did not win the challenge.
 The designer had one of the highest scores for the challenge but did not win.
 The designer had one of the lowest scores for the challenge but was not eliminated.
 The designer was in the bottom two but was not eliminated.
 The designer lost the challenge and was eliminated from the competition.
 The designer advanced to the season finale.
 Team Nick  
 Team Anya  
 Team Mondo

Episodes

References

External links
 

Project Runway
Project Runway (American series)
2010s American reality television series
2014 American television series debuts
2014 American television series endings
American television spin-offs
English-language television shows
Fashion design
Lifetime (TV network) original programming
Reality television spin-offs
Television series by Bunim/Murray Productions
Fashion-themed reality television series
Television series by The Weinstein Company